Kassner is a surname. Notable people with the surname include:

 Edward Kassner (1920–1996), music executive
 Eli Kassner (born 1924), guitar teacher and musician
 Helmut Kassner (born 1946), motorcycle road racer
 Helmut Kassner (military officer) (1897–1960)
 Horst Kassner, motorcycle road racer 
 Kerstin Kassner (born 1958), German politician
 Rudolf Kassner (1873–1959), writer

See also
 Kasner

German-language surnames